Brachinus psophia is a species of ground beetle from the Brachininae subfamily that can be found in Bulgaria, Greece, Italy, Albania, Austria, Czech Republic, France, Hungary, Moldova, Slovakia, Ukraine, all states of former Yugoslavia (except for North Macedonia), and in Western Europe. It can also be found on such European islands as Corsica, Sardinia and Sicily, and on the island of Cyprus in Asia. Besides European countries it can be found in Armenia, Iran, Iraq and Central Asian republics. It is also known from Turkey, The species were also found and described in Georgia in 2004, and Romania.

Threat
The species are under threat in the Czech Republic.

References

External links

Beetles described in 1821
Beetles of North Africa
Beetles of Asia
Beetles of Europe
Brachininae